Sobri may refer to:

People 
 Jóska Sobri (1810–1837), Hungarian outlaw
 Syamim Alif Sobri (born 1993), Malaysian footballer
 Syed Sobri (born 1994), Malaysian footballer

Other uses 
 "Sobri (notre destin)", a song by French singer Leslie
 Sobri, Valandovo, North Macedonia
 Sentral Organisasi Buruh Republik Indonesia, a defunct Indonesian trade union